Je te donne is French for "I give you".

It is also the name of:
 "Je te donne" (song), a 1985 song Jean-Jacques Goldman and Michael Jones, covered by Worlds Apart (in 1996) and by Leslie and Ivyrise (in 2012)
 Je te donne (album), a 1976 album by Léo Ferré